Michael Redman may refer to:

 Michael Redman (politician) (born 1966), former New Zealand local government administrator and politician
 Michael Redman (singer) (born 1945), American singer